HMS Talybont was a Type III Hunt-class escort destroyer who served in the Royal Navy. She was launched in February 1943 and completed in May that year, serving for the rest of the Second World War. She took part in the Normandy Landings in June 1944, supporting the landings at Omaha Beach and the Pointe du Hoc. Post war she served in the Mediterranean before being reduced to reserve at the end of 1947. She was sold for scrap in 1961, with disposal completed by 1962.

Construction
HMS Talybont was ordered for the Royal Navy from the shipbuilder J. Samuel White on 23 August 1940, one of 15 Type III Hunt-class destroyers ordered as part of the 1940 War Emergency Programme on that date. The Hunt class was meant to fill the Royal Navy's need for a large number of small destroyer-type vessels capable of both convoy escort and operations with the fleet. The Type III Hunts differed from the previous Type II ships in replacing a twin 4-inch gun mount by two torpedo tubes to improve their ability to operate as destroyers.

Talybont was laid down at White's Cowes, Isle of Wight shipyard on 28 November 1941. German air raids on the shipyard slowed construction of the ship, with Talybont not being launched until 3 February 1943 and commissioning on 19 May that year.

Displacement was  standard and   under full load.

Main gun armament was four 4 inch (102 mm) QF Mk XVI dual purpose (anti-ship and anti-aircraft) guns in two twin mounts, with a quadruple 2-pounder "pom-pom" and three Oerlikon 20 mm cannon providing close-in anti-aircraft fire.  The ship's anti-aircraft armament may have been supplemented by two Bofors 40 mm guns. Two  torpedo tubes were fitted in a single twin mount, while two depth charge chutes, four depth charge throwers and 70 depth charges comprised the ship's anti-submarine armament. Type 291 and Type 285 radars was fitted, as was Type 128 sonar.

Service
Talybont commissioned with the pennant number L18, and after work-up was allocated to the 15th Destroyer Flotilla based at Devonport, joining the Flotilla on 12 July 1943. Early on 23 October the British force encountered a force of German torpedo boats of the 4th Torpedo Boat Flotilla (and ). In the resulting confrontation, T23 and T27 torpedoed and sank Charybdis, while T22 torpedoed Limbourne, blowing off much of the front of the ship. Attempts by Talybont to take Limbourne under tow failed, and the badly damaged escort destroyer was scuttled by torpedoes from Talybont and shellfire from Rocket. Talybont collided with a merchant ship on 2 December 1943 and was under repair for a month.

M156 was badly damaged and was then sunk the next day by British Hawker Typhoon fighter-bombers of No. 266 Squadron RAF at Aber Wrac'h. The Allied invasion of Normandy in June 1944 saw Talybont assigned to the support forces for the American landings at Omaha Beach. On the morning of 6 June she and the American destroyer  provided artillery support for an assault by US Rangers at Pointe du Hoc which had the aim of knocking out a German coastal artillery position. Talybont and Satterlee operated at close range (within , with Talybont at one stage using her pom-poms against German machine gun positions) to support the landings. Talybont operated in support of the Rangers at Pont du Hoc from 05:30 hr to 07:10 hr. On 17 June Talybont was on patrol off Cherbourg when she was damaged by a near miss from German shore batteries (claimed to be from a 170 mm shell) rupturing a steam pipe and knocking out a boiler room. She was under repair for six days. On 25 June she was released to convoy escort duties in the English Channel. On the night of 23/24 August 1944, Talybont, together with the Frigate  and Motor torpedo boats MTB 692, MTB 694 and MTB 695 intercepted a force of German light craft evacuating from Le Havre. The German motor minesweeper (or R-boat) R229 and  patrol boat V716 were damaged.

Talybont transferred to the 16th Destroyer Flotilla based at Harwich for operations in the North Sea in October 1944. On 9 November 1944 she was in collision with a merchant ship and was holed on the port side aft. She was under repair for two months before returning to patrol and escort duties. The end of the war in Europe in May 1945 resulted in Talybont being allocated for service in the Far East. She was refitted at Malta from July 1945 to prepare her for service in the Pacific, and was still under refit when VJ-Day signalled the end of the war.

Post war service
On completion of the refit, Talybont joined the Mediterranean Fleet, and patrolled off the coast of Palestine to stop ships carrying illegal Jewish migrants. On 26 June 1946, Talybont, together with the destroyer  intercepted the steamer Josiah Wedgewood, formerly the Canadian corvette , carrying 1250 Jewish refugees. On 19 January 1947 Talybont collided with a wreck in Haifa harbour, and was under repair at Malta until May that year.

She was reduced to reserve at Portsmouth by the end of 1947, and remained in reserve at various ports around the British Isles for the rest of her career. She was used as a harbour training ship at Rosyth between 1958 and 1960. On 14 February 1961 she arrived at Charlestown for breaking up, with scrapping complete by 3 May 1962, with a scrap value of £19,950.

Notes

References

Publications

Further reading

Hunt-class destroyers of the Royal Navy
1943 ships
World War II destroyers of the United Kingdom